Hiranaka (written 平仲 or 平中) is a Japanese surname. Notable people with the surname include:

, Japanese boxer
, Japanese swimmer
, Japanese racing driver

Japanese-language surnames